Ceratobregma acanthops, known commonly as the spotted spiny-eye triplefin, is a species of triplefin blenny which is found off north-eastern Australia.

References

acanthops
Fish described in 1964